Xicotencatl I or Xicotencatl the Elder (c. 11 House (1425) – c. 4 Rabbit (1522)) was a long-lived tlatoani (king) of Tizatlan, a Nahua altepetl within the pre-Columbian confederacy of Tlaxcala, in what is now Mexico.

Etymology
His Nahuatl name, pronounced , is sometimes spelled Xicohtencatl. In 1519 he was baptized as Lorenzo Xicotencatl or Don Lorenzo de Vargas.

Biography
At the time of the Spanish conquest of the Aztec Empire he was very old and of poor health.  He was instrumental in aligning the Tlaxcala with Hernán Cortés' Spaniards.

Tlaxcalan historian Diego Muñoz Camargo wrote of him that he was more than 120 years old and that he could only see Cortés if he had someone lift his eyelids for him. He also writes that he had more than 500 wives and concubines and consequently a large number of children, including Xicotencatl II and the wife of Jorge de Alvarado - Doña Lucía. His great-grandson Captain Don Joaquin Buenaventura de la Paz was the founder of the Tlaxcalan settlement of San Esteban de Nueva Tlaxcala near Saltillo, Coahuila, Mexico in the year 1591.

When his son plotted to seize Tlaxcala in Chichimecatecle's absence during the Siege of Tenochtitlan, Xicontencatl I told Cortés that "his son was wicked and he would not vouch for him, and begging Cortés to kill him."  This Cortés ordered and Xicotencatl II was hanged.

Poetry
One song or poem attributed to Xicotencatl is known. It is recorded in the Cantares mexicanos (fols. 57v.–58r.), a collection of Nahuatl songs probably compiled in the last third of the 16th century for Bernardino de Sahagún, and concerns the flower wars conducted between Tlaxcala and the states of the Aztec Triple Alliance.

See also
Spanish conquest of the Aztec Empire
Xicotencatl II

Notes

References

1420s births
1520s deaths
Longevity myths
Tlatoque
Nahuatl-language poets
Tlaxcaltec nobility

Nobility of the Americas